Haysville USD 261 is a public unified school district headquartered in Haysville, Kansas, United States.  The district includes the communities of Haysville, small southern part of Wichita, and nearby rural areas.

Schools
The school district operates the following schools:

High school
 Campus High School

Middle schools
Haysville Middle School
Haysville West Middle School

Elementary schools
Freeman Elementary
Nelson Elementary
Oatville Elementary
Prairie Elementary
Rex Elementary
Ruth Clark Elementary

Specialty Facilities
Haysville High School/Charter School
Tri-City Day School
Learning By Design Charter School
Early Childhood

See also
 Kansas State Department of Education
 Kansas State High School Activities Association
 List of high schools in Kansas
 List of unified school districts in Kansas

References

External links
 
 USD 261 School Boundary Map, USD 261

School districts in Kansas
Education in Sedgwick County, Kansas